My Wife's Best Friend is a 1952 American comedy film directed by Richard Sale, starring Anne Baxter and Macdonald Carey, with Catherine McLeod in the titular role. It was produced and distributed by 20th Century Fox.

Plot

Virginia Mason (Anne Baxter) and George (Macdonald Carey), husband and wife from Mellford, Illinois, are passengers on an airliner for a second honeymoon in Hawaii. When the plane develops serious engine trouble, it looks like the end for everyone on board. Certain that he's facing an imminent demise, George confesses to Virginia that he's had an affair with her best friend Jane Richards (Catherine McLeod). Virginia mulls over several potential revenges in her mind, casting herself as various famous women of history. The plane lands safely, at which time Virginia learns that the "affair" was nothing more than a discreet flirtation.

Cast
 Anne Baxter as Virginia Mason
 Macdonald Carey as George Mason
 Cecil Kellaway as Rev. Thomas Chamberlain
 Max Showalter as Pete Bentham 
 Catherine McLeod as Jane Richards
 Leif Erickson as Nicholas Reed
 Frances Bavier as Mrs. Chamberlain
 Mary Sullivan as Flossy Chamberlain
 Martin Milner as Buddy Chamberlain
 Billie Bird as Katie
 Michael Ross as 	Matt 
 Morgan Farley as Dr. McCurran 
 Junius Matthews as 	Rev. Dr. Smith 
 Henry Kulky as 	Pug
 Emmett Vogan as 	Walter Rogers 
 Ann Staunton as	Hannah - Secretary
 Edgar Dearing as 	Police Chief
 May Wynn as Stewardess

References

External links
 
 
 
 

Films directed by Richard Sale
1952 films
American black-and-white films
1952 romantic comedy films
American romantic comedy films
Films scored by Leigh Harline
20th Century Fox films
1950s English-language films
1950s American films